North Macedonia is a member state of the North Atlantic Treaty Organization (NATO). In 1995, the country joined the Partnership for Peace. It then began taking part in various NATO missions, including the International Security Assistance Force and the Resolute Support Mission in Afghanistan. At the 2008 Bucharest summit, Greece vetoed the country's invitation to join; however, NATO member states agreed that the country would receive an invitation upon resolution of the Macedonia naming dispute. Following an agreement in June 2018 to rename the country, representatives of NATO member states signed a protocol on the accession of North Macedonia to NATO on 6 February 2019. Over the next thirteen months, all of NATO's 29 member states ratified the protocol. The accession protocol entered into force on 19 March 2020, allowing North Macedonia to deposit its instrument of accession and thereby become a member state of NATO on 27 March 2020.

History

The then Republic of Macedonia joined the Partnership for Peace in 1995 and commenced its Membership Action Plan in 1999 at the Washington Summit, at the same time as eight other countries (Albania, Bulgaria, Estonia, Latvia, Lithuania, Romania, Slovenia, Slovakia). Macedonia was part of the Vilnius Group and formed the Adriatic Charter with Croatia and Albania in 2003 to better coordinate NATO accession.  

Participating in the 1999 NATO intervention in Kosovo, it received aid from NATO in dealing with refugees fleeing from Kosovo. In August 2001, NATO intervened in the 2001 insurgency, during which an Albanian group, the National Liberation Army, fought government forces. In Operation Essential Harvest, NATO troops joined with the Macedonian military to disarm these forces following a cease-fire agreement.

At the 2008 Bucharest summit, Greece vetoed the Republic of Macedonia's invitation to join over the Macedonia naming dispute, however, NATO nations agreed that the country would receive an invitation upon resolution of the disagreement. Greece felt that its neighbour's constitutional name implies territorial aspirations against its own region of Macedonia. The Republic of Macedonia sued Greece in the International Court of Justice over their veto of Macedonia's NATO membership, citing their 1995 interim accord that allowed Macedonia to join international organizations under the name "the Former Yugoslav Republic of Macedonia", which is how NATO, with the exception of Turkey, recognized their bid. Greece counterargued that it was a collective decision of NATO not to invite the Republic of Macedonia, and therefore the interim accord signed between the two countries was not violated. The ICJ ruled in December 2011 that Greece was wrong to have blocked its neighbor's bid, finding them in breach of the agreement. Greece also blocked the Republic of Macedonia's start of negotiations on accession to the European Union over the naming dispute.

Then–United States Secretary of State Hillary Clinton asked the Republic of Macedonia and Greece to find an "acceptable solution" to the dispute, so that the Republic of Macedonia would be free to join NATO. In 2014, prior to the 65th anniversary of its founding, NATO announced that it would not be offering any new countries membership in the organisation that year. Some analysts, such as Jorge Benitez of the Atlantic Council think tank, argued that this reluctance was partly due to the new security climate after Russia's annexation of Crimea. There has been continued debate about how Russia will view the republic's accession.

In March 2016, Macedonian Defense Minister Zoran Jolevski stated his hope that his country's handling of the 2015 European migrant crisis might bring it closer to NATO membership.

On 12 June 2017, Prime Minister Zoran Zaev signaled he would consider alternative names for the country in order to strike a compromise with Greece, settle the naming dispute, and lift Greek objections to Macedonia joining the alliance. Zaev also floated the idea of Macedonia joining the alliance under the provisional name it used at the United Nations.  The naming dispute was resolved with the Prespa Agreement in June 2018 under which the country adopted the name North Macedonia, which was supported by a referendum in September 2018.  On 11 July 2018, NATO invited the republic to begin membership talks, saying the country could join the organisation once the naming agreement had been implemented. Formal accession talks began on 18 October 2018. On 6 February 2019, the permanent representatives to NATO of the member states signed a protocol on the accession of North Macedonia to NATO.

Macedonian Prime Minister Zoran Zaev, speaking alongside NATO Secretary-General Jens Stoltenberg in Skopje on 3 June 2019, said that he expected the ratification process to be finalised by the end of October. By that time North Macedonia was expected to join NATO in early 2020, with the alliance publicly reassuring the country its accession would go ahead. North Macedonia was given a seat at the 2019 London summit alongside other NATO members and was represented by a delegation headed by Prime Minister Zoran Zaev. On 11 February 2020, the Macedonian Sobranie unanimously approved the North Atlantic Treaty, with 114 votes in favour, no abstentions and no opposition. Due to its political crisis, Spain was the last country to ratify the accession protocol, which it did on 19 March 2020. North Macedonia subsequently signed the instrument of accession and became a member state on 27 March 2020.

On 9 December 2021, a ceremony was held at Skopje Airport to mark the inclusion of North Macedonia in the NATO Air Policing system.

Accession

Negotiation progress 

The country acceded to the NATO Ottawa Agreement on 2 June 2022.

Ratification process

Note

Public opinion

During the Kosovo War of 1999, the Macedonian government maintained a pro-NATO position. A majority of the population of the Republic of Macedonia criticised the government stance and opposed NATO intervention in Kosovo due to fears over irredentism from ethnic Albanians within the country, the unstable economy, disruption of trade brought about by war, and Slavic solidarity with Serbs. Prime Minister Ljubčo Georgievski stated during the war that anti-NATO sentiment was the "second biggest threat" to the country after the arrival of Albanian refugees from Kosovo. The country's Albanian population supported NATO and its intervention to assist the Albanians of Kosovo.

In 2008, a poll following the NATO summit showed that 82.5% of ethnic Macedonian citizens opposed changing their country's constitutional name in order to join NATO. NATO membership in general in 2008 was supported by 85.2% of the population. Elections were called following the 2008 summit, resulting in further support for the center-right pro-NATO party, VMRO-DPMNE. The elections were marred by violence that attracted criticism from NATO members.

In a statewide 2010 survey, 80.02% of respondents said they would vote for the Republic of Macedonia to become part of NATO if a referendum on accession were to take place. In another survey, some 65% of ethnic Macedonians expressed that they opposed a name change of the state as being the price for NATO membership.

In a 2016 poll, some 68% of ethnic Macedonians supported joining NATO, possibly under the FYROM name. Albanians of North Macedonia harbour strongly pro-NATO sentiments.

See also
 Accession of North Macedonia to the European Union
 Enlargement of NATO
 Foreign relations of North Macedonia
 Macedonia naming dispute

References

External links
 

North Macedonia
NATO
North Macedonia and NATO